Tamara McKinney (born October 16, 1962) is a former World Cup alpine ski racer from the United States. She won four World Cup season titles, most notably the 1983 overall, the first American woman title holder for a quarter century. McKinney's other three season titles were in giant slalom (1981, 1983) and slalom (1984). She was a world champion in the combined event in 1989, her final year of competition.  

Her half-brother Steve McKinney was a world-record holding speed skier, setting seven world records and breaking his own record twice.

Life and career
Born in Lexington, Kentucky, the diminutive McKinney grew up in Squaw Valley, California, the youngest of seven children.

She made her World Cup debut in December 1978 at age 16 with a podium finish in a slalom in Italy. Her first World Cup victory came at age 18 in January 1981, the first of four wins in giant slalom that breakthrough season. McKinney raced on the World Cup circuit for eleven seasons, and competed in three Olympics and five world championships. She won four medals in the world championships; bronze medals in the combined (1985, 1987) and slalom (1989), and a gold medal in the combined at Vail in 1989.

While winning the overall World Cup in 1983 at age 20, she also won the giant slalom title, which she had first won in 1981.  In 1984 McKinney won the slalom title, and took fourth place in the giant slalom at the Winter Olympics in Sarajevo, behind teammates Debbie Armstrong and Christin Cooper. McKinney participated in Prince Edward Windsor of the United Kingdom of Great Britain and Northern Ireland's charity television special The Grand Knockout Tournament in 1987.

While training for the upcoming 1990 season, McKinney broke her left leg (for the third time) in Saas Fee, Switzerland, in mid-October 1989. Slow to recover, she announced her retirement in November 1990 at age 28 and completed her career with 18 World Cup victories, 45 podiums, and 99 top ten finishes. Eight of her victories were in the U.S., with six at Waterville Valley, New Hampshire, which included double victories in 1983 and 1984.  Along with Gretchen Fraser, Andrea Mead Lawrence, Lindsey Vonn, and Mikaela Shiffrin, McKinney is regarded as one of the top female alpine ski racers in U.S. history.

She was inducted in the Kentucky Athletic Hall of Fame in 2004, and is a realtor in the Lake Tahoe area.

World Cup results

Season standings

Season titles

Race victories
18 wins - (9 GS, 9 SL)
45 podiums

World championship results 

From 1948 through 1980, the Winter Olympics were also the World Championships for alpine skiing.

Olympic results

Video
You Tube.com – 1989 World Championships – gold medal in combined

References

External links
 
 
 Ski World Cup.org - biography - Tamara McKinney
 Sports Illustrated – cover – 1984 Winter Olympics preview
 TIME.com - "For Purple Mountains' Majesty" (March 21, 1983)
 TIME.com - "Their Success Is All in the Family" (January 30, 1984)
 Kentucky Athletic Hall of Fame (2004)
 tamaramckinney.com - web site - real estate

American female alpine skiers
Alpine skiers at the 1980 Winter Olympics
Alpine skiers at the 1984 Winter Olympics
Alpine skiers at the 1988 Winter Olympics
Olympic alpine skiers of the United States
Sportspeople from California
Sportspeople from Lexington, Kentucky
1962 births
Living people
FIS Alpine Ski World Cup champions
People from Olympic Valley, California
Sportswomen from Kentucky
21st-century American women